Psychiatric Rehabilitation Journal is a peer-reviewed medical journal published by the American Psychological Association. It was established in 1978 and covers research on the topics of "rehabilitation, psychosocial treatment, and recovery of people with serious mental illnesses". The current editor-in-chief is Sandra G. Resnick (Yale University).

Abstracting and indexing 
The journal is abstracted and indexed by MEDLINE/PubMed and the Social Sciences Citation Index. According to the Journal Citation Reports, the journal has a 2020 impact factor of 1.935.

References

External links 
 

American Psychological Association academic journals
English-language journals
Quarterly journals
Rehabilitation medicine journals
Psychiatry journals
Publications established in 2002